Brian Maurice Brain (born 13 September 1940, in Worcester) is a former English first-class cricketer whose career with Worcestershire and Gloucestershire stretched over more than two decades. He was capped by Worcestershire in 1966 and by Gloucestershire in 1977.

Brain was educated at the King's School, Worcester.

After turning in some good performances in the Worcestershire second team, Brain was selected to make his first-class debut against Oxford University in late June 1959. He took five wickets in the match (his first being that of Oxford captain Alan Smith), but played only one further first-class game that season, against Somerset in the County Championship. He took 4–53 in the first innings, but was not to make another first-team appearance for almost five years.

After some more eye-catching figures in the second team (7–29 against Nottinghamshire II; 8–79 against Kent II) in 1964, Brain finally played first-class cricket again, facing Cambridge University at Halesowen. He took only one wicket, but was retained for the Championship game which followed (coincidentally this was also against Somerset), and in this match he excelled, taking 6–93 and 4–73 as Worcestershire won by 122 runs. Although he dropped out of the side thereafter, he returned as a regular from mid-August to the end of the season, finishing with 31 wickets at 24.19 as Worcestershire won their first ever County Championship.

He went on Worcestershire's tour of Rhodesia in 1964–65, one of only two occasions on which Brain played overseas (the other being the county's tour of West Indies the following winter). He played in one of the two first-class games against the Rhodesians, then back in England for the 1965 season he appeared 12 times, taking five or more wickets in an innings three times to finish with 44 first-class victims. In that season he also played his first List A cricket, against Sussex in the Gillette Cup: his first two victims in one-day cricket were Ted Dexter and Jim Parks.

For most of the rest of the 1960s, Brain continued to play a dozen games a season or slightly more, as well as a handful of one-day matches, and to pick up around 40 wickets a year. In 1969, however, he played 19 times in first-class cricket and snared 73 wickets at just over 25 runs apiece; he also appeared 13 times in one-day cricket, albeit with considerably less success. In 1970 he played only seven first-class matches, then for the next two seasons he was entirely a one-day player, turning out 20 times in List A cricket but not at all in the longer form of the game.

The 1973 season saw Brain make his return to first-class duties, and he immediately delivered, taking 84 wickets at 19.29 that year, a career best tally that he was to equal (at an average only slightly higher) the following summer. Those two seasons also saw him pick up 58 one-day wickets, while in the Championship he took 6-32 in June 1973, and 6–36 against Gloucestershire in July 1973. His form dipped a little in 1975, but he still took more than 50 first-class wickets, including a career-best 8–55 against Essex in late May; that performance was in vain, however, as a second-innings Worcestershire collapse saw them lose by 29 runs.

For the 1976 season, Brain moved to Gloucestershire, starting relatively slowly with 41 first-class wickets in that first year. Then in 1977 he claimed 77 wickets, managing his best bowling for his new county when he recorded 7–51 against the touring Australians in May.  He also achieved his only first-class half-century in 1977: he made 57 against Essex at Cheltenham, his team's second-highest score after Zaheer Abbas's 153, as Gloucestershire won by an innings and 64 runs. This 57 was a somewhat startling scorecard entry, as in his other eleven innings that season his highest score was just 6. The following summer, 1978, he took 76 first-class wickets. That season also saw him achieve his highest season's total of List A wickets: he dismissed 34 victims, at an outstanding bowling average of only 14.55.

Now approaching forty years old, Brain's form began to tail off, although he was still good enough to take a total of 106 first-class and 46 List A wickets in the next two seasons, with 6–68 against Glamorgan in May 1980 a highlight of his later years. He took his last first-class wicket (John Barclay) against Sussex in July 1981, although he did play two further Championship games without reward. 

He played very briefly for Shropshire, and his final List A game was an unusual one for Minor Counties against Leicestershire in the 1982 Benson and Hedges Cup; he picked up the wickets of ex-Test cricketers Chris Balderstone and Roger Tolchard as Leicestershire were bowled out for only 56 to lose by 131 runs, with Wisden complaining that "Leicestershire's batsmen were in no mood for a testing struggle".

References

External links
 
 Statistical summary from CricketArchive

English cricketers
Gloucestershire cricketers
Worcestershire cricketers
1940 births
Living people
Sportspeople from Worcester, England
Minor Counties cricketers
Shropshire cricketers
People educated at King's School, Worcester